Gaines is an English surname of Norman origin. Notable people with the surname include:

Brian R. Gaines (born c. 1938), British systems scientist and engineer
Cassie Gaines (1948–1977), American singer; backup singer for Lynyrd Skynyrd, sister of Steve
Charles Gaines (writer) (born 1942), American writer and outdoorsman
Charles Gaines (basketball) (born 1981), American basketball player
Chris Gaines (1999–1999), fictional alter ego of American country singer Garth Brooks
Chris Gaines (gridiron football) (born 1965), American football player
Clarence Gaines (1923–2005), American basketball coach
Corey Gaines (born 1965), American basketball player and coach
Smokey Gaines (1940–2020), American basketball player
David Gaines (racing driver) (1963–1990), American race car driver
Earl Gaines (1935–2009), American blues singer
Edmund P. Gaines (1777–1849), United States Army officer, brother of George Strother
Ernest J. Gaines (1933–2019), African American author
George Gaines (set decorator) (1933–1986), American art director
George Strother Gaines (1784–1873), American leader in the Mississippi Territory, brother of Edmund
Grady Gaines (1934–2021), American blues tenor saxophonist 
Greg Gaines (defensive lineman) (born 1996), American football player
Greg Gaines (linebacker) (born 1958), American football player and coach
Innis Gaines (born 1998), American football player
 Jacques Gaines (fl. 1994), Canadian singer, lead singer of Soul Attorneys
John P. Gaines (1795–1857), American Governor of Oregon Territory
John W. Gaines (1860–1926), American politician from Tennessee
Lloyd L. Gaines, (born 1911, disappeared 1939), American civil rights litigant
Max Gaines (1894–1947), American comic book publisher, father of William
Reece Gaines (born 1981), American basketball player
Richard Gaines (1904–1975), American actor
Rowdy Gaines (born 1959), American swimmer
Roy Gaines (1937–2021), American blues guitarist
Ruth Gaines-Shelton (1872–1934), American educator and writer
Sheldon Gaines (born 1964), American football player
Stanley F. Gaines (1891–1950), American politician from Mississippi
Stanley O. Gaines, American psychologist
Steve Gaines (1949–1977), American musician, guitarist and songwriter for Lynyrd Skynyrd
Walter Lee Gaines (1881–1950), American dairy scientist
William Gaines (1922–1992), American publisher of EC Comics, founder of Mad magazine
William E. Gaines (1844–1912), American politician, Civil War veteran
William Gaines (professor) (1933–2016), American journalist and professor of journalism
Surnames of Norman origin

Surnames of English origin